German submarine U-322 was a Type VIIC/41 U-boat of Nazi Germany's Kriegsmarine during World War II.

The boat was sunk on 29 December 1944 by a Canadian corvette in the English Channel.

Design
German Type VIIC/41 submarines were preceded by the heavier Type VIIC submarines. U-322 had a displacement of  when at the surface and  while submerged. She had two shafts and two  propellers.

U-322 was fitted with five  torpedo tubes (four fitted at the bow and one at the stern), fourteen torpedoes, one  SK C/35 naval gun, (220 rounds), one  Flak M42 and two  C/30 anti-aircraft guns. The boat had a complement of between forty-four and sixty.

Service history

The submarine was laid down on 13 February 1943 by the Flender Werke yard at Lübeck as yard number 322, launched on 18 December and commissioned on 5 February 1944 under the command of Oberleutnant zur See Gerhard Wysk.

She served with the 4th U-boat Flotilla for training, from 5 February 1944 to 31 October and the 11th flotilla for operations until her sinking on 29 December.

First patrol
U-322 departed Kiel on 2 November 1944 and arrived in Horten Naval Base (south of Oslo), on the sixth.

Second patrol and loss
The boat left Horten on 15 November 1944, heading for the 'gap' between the Faroe and Shetland Islands and passing west of Ireland. On 23 December, she sank Dumfries off St Catherine's Point, Isle of Wight in the English Channel. On the 29th, seven miles off the Portland lighthouse near Weymouth, she attacked Arthur Sewall and Black Hawk, causing both vessels to be declared a total loss. She was sunk on the same day by depth charges dropped from the Canadian corvette .

Fifty two men died; there were no survivors.

Previously recorded fate
U-322 was sunk on 25 November 1944 west of the Shetland Islands by the British frigate .

Discovery

Summary of raiding history

See also
 Battle of the Atlantic (1939-1945)

References

Bibliography

External links

German Type VIIC/41 submarines
U-boats commissioned in 1944
1943 ships
World War II submarines of Germany
Ships built in Lübeck
U-boats sunk by depth charges
U-boats sunk by Canadian warships
Ships lost with all hands
U-boats sunk in 1944
Maritime incidents in December 1944